Herbertson Glacier is a small alpine glacier which drains from the cliff that forms the southern margin of New Harbour, about  west-southwest of Butter Point, Victoria Land, Antarctica. It was named by the British Antarctic Expedition, 1910–13, presumably for British geographer A.J. Herbertson of Oxford University.

References

Glaciers of Victoria Land
Scott Coast